The Hon. Matthew Joseph Foley (born 24 January 1951) is a former Australian politician.

Early life
Before entering politics, he was a barrister and social worker, and sub-dean of the Social Work Faculty at Queensland University 1981–1983. He was chairperson of the Social Security Appeals Tribunal (1983–1986), president of the Queensland Council for Civil Liberties (1985–1987), a member of the Criminal Law Sub-Committee of the Bar Association of Queensland and of the National Consumer Affairs Advisory Council (1988–1989) and National President of the Labor Lawyers Association (1989).

Political career
In 1989, Foley was elected to the Legislative Assembly of Queensland as the Labor member for Yeronga. From 1992 onward, Foley served as Attorney-General of Queensland and Minister for the Arts, among other roles, in the Wayne Goss Government. 

In opposition from 1996 to 1998, Foley was Shadow Attorney-General. 

When Labor won government under Peter Beattie in 1998, Foley was appointed Minister for the Arts, Attorney-General and Minister for Justice. At the 2001 election, his seat was abolished and he successfully contested Yeerongpilly. Judge Roslyn Atkinson has credited Foley, in his role as Queensland Attorney-General, with making the Bench more inclusive and representative of wider society, and specifically appointing more women to the Bench. After the election, he became Minister for Employment, Training and Youth, keeping his responsibility for the Arts but leaving his legal portfolios. 

Foley retired from politics in 2004.

References

Attorneys-General of Queensland
1951 births
Living people
Members of the Queensland Legislative Assembly
Australian Labor Party members of the Parliament of Queensland
21st-century Australian politicians